Morris Gleitzman (born 9 January 1953) is an English-born Australian author of children's and young adult fiction. He has gained recognition for sparking an interest in AIDS in his controversial novel Two Weeks with the Queen (1990).

Gleitzman has co-written many children's series with another Australian children's author, Paul Jennings. One of Gleitzman and Jennings' collaborations, the Wicked! book series, was adapted into an animated series in 2000. Gleitzman has also published three collections of his newspaper columns for The Age and The Sydney Morning Herald as books for an adult readership, and he used to write for the popular Norman Gunston Show in the 1970s. His latest book in the Once series, Always, was released in 2021. His is also known for his Toad series of books.

In February 2018, Gleitzman was named the Australian Children's Laureate for 2018/2019.

Early life
Gleitzman was born in Sleaford, Lincolnshire. He moved to Australia in 1969 when he was 16.
He is married with children.
His parents live in Australia

Bibliography

Books

Awards
1993
BILBY Award (Blabber Mouth)
CROW Award (Blabber Mouth)
1994
CROW Award (Sticky Beak)
1997
COOL Award (Belly Flop)
1998
BILBY Award (Bumface)
COOL Award (Bumface)
KOALA Award (Bumface)
YABBA Award (Bumface)
 2001
YABBA Award: Older Readers (Toad Rage)
2008
ANTO Cole Award (Toad Rage)
2013
COOL Award (Pizza Cake)
2016
Children's Book Council of Australia Book of the Year: Younger Readers (Soon)

References

External links
 
 Morris Gleitzman, Puffin Books

1953 births
Living people
Australian children's writers
People educated at Chislehurst and Sidcup Grammar School
Australian people of Polish-Jewish descent
English emigrants to Australia
English people of Polish-Jewish descent
Jewish Australian writers
University of Canberra alumni